Vampyriscus nymphaea is a species of bat in the family Phyllostomidae, the leaf-nosed bats. It is known commonly as the striped yellow-eared bat. It is native to Colombia, Costa Rica, Ecuador, Nicaragua, Panama, and Honduras.

References

Phyllostomidae
Bats of Central America
Bats of South America
Mammals of Colombia
Mammals of Ecuador
Mammals described in 1909
Taxonomy articles created by Polbot
Taxa named by Oldfield Thomas